San Bruno (Spanish for "St. Bruno") is a city in San Mateo County, California, United States, incorporated in 1914. The population was 43,908 at the 2020 United States Census.

Geography
The city is located between South San Francisco and Millbrae, adjacent to San Francisco International Airport to the east and Golden Gate National Cemetery to the northwest.

San Bruno City Hall sits at an official elevation of 41 feet (12.5 m) above sea level.

Portions of Mills Park, Crestmoor, and Rollingwood are very hilly, featuring canyons and ravines. Creeks, many of them now in culverts, flow from springs in the hills toward San Francisco Bay. Just west of Skyline Boulevard and outside of city limits is San Andreas Lake, which got its name from the San Andreas Fault. The lake is one of several reservoirs used by the San Francisco Water Department, providing water to San Francisco and several communities in San Mateo County, including San Bruno west of I-280.

Climate

San Bruno has a mild Mediterranean climate characterized by mild to warm, dry summers and cool, wet winters. San Bruno has much milder temperatures than most of the state. Owing to its relatively mild temperatures, the city's climate closely resembles that of an oceanic climate. Since 1927, the National Weather Service (formerly the U.S. Weather Bureau) has maintained a weather station at the nearby San Francisco International Airport (formerly Mills Field). According to the official records, January is the coldest month with an average high of 55.9 °F (13.3 °C) and an average low of 42.9 °F (6.1 °C).

Freezing temperatures occur on an average of only 1.3 days annually.

Temperatures exceed  on an average of 4.0 days annually. Fog and low overcast are common during the night and morning hours in the summer months, which are generally very dry except for occasional light drizzle from the fog. On rare occasions moisture moving up from tropical storms has produced thunderstorms or showers in the summer. Gusty westerly winds are also common in the afternoon during the summer. Until August 1, 1993, it had never reached  in August, which is one of the foggier months in the area. Due to thermal inversions, summer temperatures in the higher hills are often much higher than at the airport.

Thunderstorms occur several times a year, mostly during the winter months, but are usually quite brief. Nylund also took temperature observations for several years and published weekly weather reports in the San Bruno Herald from 1966 to 1969, which were included in official reports for the Golden Gate National Cemetery. The annual average days with measurable precipitation is 65.2 days. Nylund reported  in Crestmoor during a 24-hour period in January 1967. Winter storms are often accompanied by strong southerly winds.

Demographics

2010
The 2010 United States Census reported that San Bruno had a population of 41,114. The racial makeup of San Bruno was 20,350 (49.5%) White, 942 (2.3%) African American, 246 (0.6%) Native American, 10,423 (25.4%) Asian, 1,377 (3.3%) Pacific Islander, 5,075 (12.3%) from other races, and 2,701 (6.6%) from two or more races. Hispanic or Latino of any race were 12,016 persons (29.2%).

The Census reported that 40,716 people (99.0% of the population) lived in households, 316 (0.8%) lived in non-institutionalized group quarters, and 82 (0.2%) were institutionalized.

There were 14,701 households, out of which 4,831 (32.9%) had children under the age of 18 living in them, 7,364 (50.1%) were opposite-sex married couples living together, 1,830 (12.4%) had a female householder with no husband present, 850 (5.8%) had a male householder with no wife present.  There were 764 (5.2%) unmarried opposite-sex partnerships, and 123 (0.8%) same-sex married couples or partnerships. 3,660 households (24.9%) were made up of individuals, and 1,119 (7.6%) had someone living alone who was 65 years of age or older. The average household size was 2.77.  There were 10,044 families (68.3% of all households); the average family size was 3.31.

The population was spread out, with 8,632 people (21.0%) under the age of 18, 3,577 people (8.7%) aged 18 to 24, 12,038 people (29.3%) aged 25 to 44, 11,653 people (28.3%) aged 45 to 64, and 5,214 people (12.7%) who were 65 years of age or older.  The median age was 38.8 years. For every 100 females, there were 97.1 males.  For every 100 females age 18 and over, there were 95.1 males.

The homeowner vacancy rate was 1.1%; the rental vacancy rate was 3.9%.  24,712 people (60.1% of the population) lived in owner-occupied housing units and 16,004 people (38.9%) lived in rental housing units.

2000
As of the census of 2008, there were 42,401 people, 15,486 households, and 10,561 families residing in the city.

There were 15,486 households, out of which 35.4% had children under the age of 18 living with them, 47.8% were married couples living together, 12.2% had a female householder with no husband present, and 35.4% were non-families. 28.5% of all households were made up of individuals, and 5.8% had someone living alone who was 65 years of age or older. The average household size was 3.72 and the average family size was 4.29.

In the city, the age distribution of the population shows 25.0% under the age of 18, 11.2% from 18 to 24, 35.5% from 25 to 44, 22.1% from 45 to 64, and 9.2% who were 65 years of age or older. The median age was 33 years. For every 100 females, there were 97.5 males. For every 100 females age 18 and over, there were 95.1 males.

The median household income for the city was $60,081, and the median income for a family was $69,251 (these figures had risen to $71,869 and $80,401 respectively as of a 2008 estimate). Males had a median income of $47,843 versus $39,851 for females. The per capita income for the city was $25,360. About 5.1% of families and 7.4% of the population were below the poverty line, including 5.8% of those under age 18 and 6.5% of those age 65 or over.

Politics

The current Mayor of San Bruno is Rico E. Medina, who began his term as Mayor on December 12, 2017. He has previously been a Council Member. The previous mayor of San Bruno was Jim Ruane, who was first elected in 2009 and served until December 2017.  The mayor before Jim Ruane was Larry Franzella, who was first elected November 1999 and was reelected through November 2009. Bob Marshall, "Mr. San Bruno", served as mayor from 1980 to 1992. San Bruno is one of the few cities in San Mateo County with an independently elected mayor.

According to the California Secretary of State, as of February 10, 2019, San Bruno has 22,808 registered voters. Of those, 11,856 (52%) are registered Democrats, 3,051 (13.4%) are registered Republicans, and 6,993 (30.1%) have declined to state a political party.

Parks
San Bruno City Park, bordered by Crystal Springs Avenue and El Crystal School, is the major municipal park. It offers shaded walkways and hiking trails, picnic tables, a playground, a small ballpark, a municipal swimming pool, and a recreation center that includes an indoor basketball court once used for training by the San Francisco Warriors basketball team. There are smaller municipal parks in other parts of the city.

Junipero Serra County Park, also accessible from Crystal Springs Avenue, is a  park owned by San Mateo County and includes numerous hiking trails, as well as picnic shelters, barbecue pits, and picnic tables. The wilderness area was named for Junípero Serra, a Franciscan friar who founded many of the Spanish missions in California during the eighteenth century; Serra regularly passed through what is now San Bruno whenever he visited the mission at San Francisco. The park is administered by the San Mateo County Parks and Recreation Department, which charges a $6 entry fee for vehicles.

Education
San Mateo Union High School District also serves the city, and most students who attend secondary public education attend Capuchino High School, the only high school in the community after Crestmoor High School was closed in 1980. The city's main library is part of the Peninsula Library System. Skyline College, a community college that is part of the San Mateo Community College District (SMCCD), is located in San Bruno.

History

Early years
San Bruno was the location of the Ohlone village Urebure. It was explored in November 1769 by a Spanish expedition led by Gaspar de Portolà. Later, more extensive explorations by Bruno de Heceta resulted in the naming of San Bruno Creek after St. Bruno of Cologne, the founder of a medieval monastic order. This creek apparently later gave its name to the community.

With the establishment of the San Francisco de Asís (St. Francis of Assisi) mission, much of the area became pasture for the mission livestock. Following the decline of the missions, the area became part of Rancho Buri Buri granted to José de la Cruz Sánchez, the eleventh Alcalde (mayor) of San Francisco. After Jose Antonio Sanchez died, his heirs divided the Rancho and sold it off. Dairy farms later became common in much of the area.

The city began as Clarks's Station, a stop on the Butterfield Overland Mail stagecoach route, utilizing an inn built in 1849, which was initially called Thorp's Place and later Uncle Tom's Cabin or 14 Mile House.  The inn was demolished in 1949 and replaced with a Lucky's supermarket (now a Walgreens drugstore, on the corner of El Camino Real and Crystal Springs Avenue). Gus Jenevein (for whom Jenevein Avenue was named) built another landmark called San Bruno House, which burned several times and was not rebuilt after the third fire. A few homes and farms were developed in the area. The railroad between San Francisco and San Jose built a train station at San Bruno in the 1860s. The railroad eventually became part of the Southern Pacific system, which ran both passenger and freight trains on the line. Today it is known as Caltrain.

A U.S. Post Office was first established at San Bruno in 1875. Postal services were discontinued for several months in both 1890 and 1891, then from 1893 to 1898. There has been a post office in San Bruno continuously since 1898. The present post office is located near the Tanforan shopping center.

20th century 
Real growth and development began after the 1906 earthquake and fire. The city's first public school was completed in late 1906. With the construction of Edgemont Elementary School in 1910, all classes were moved there and the original school building became a public facility named Green Hall. Another school, North Brae Elementary School, opened in 1912; among its earliest students was future actor Eddie "Rochester" Anderson. Paving of California's first state highway, El Camino Real, began in 1912 in front of San Bruno's Uncle Tom's Cabin; the highway is now designated as State Route 82. The adjoining San Francisco International Airport opened in early 1927 and included a Weather Bureau station, now operated by the National Weather Service. Charles Lindbergh was an early visitor to the airport, during his national tour following his successful transatlantic flight; unfortunately, his airplane (Spirit of St. Louis) became stuck in the mud.

On January 18, 1911, aviator Eugene Ely made naval aviation history when he took off from Tanforan and made a successful landing on the armored cruiser  anchored in San Francisco Bay. This marked the first successful shipboard aircraft landing.

Following a campaign by the local newspaper, the San Bruno Herald, the community was incorporated in 1914, mainly so the streets could be paved. Green Hall became the first city hall. San Bruno grew rapidly, passing 1,500 residents by 1920 and 3,610 residents in 1930. Additional schools, including New Edgemont (later renamed Decima Allen) and Crystal Springs, were built during the 1940s.

In 1930, the El Camino Theater opened at the corner of El Camino Real and San Mateo Avenue. The popular theater, wired for sound, replaced the earlier Melody Theater, which had presented silent films. The El Camino showed double features, cartoons, short comedies, adventure serials, and newsreels during its history, including Saturday matinees and summer Wednesday matinees for children. Normally, films changed every week, but in 1958 Cecil B. DeMille's The Ten Commandments ran for two weeks to packed audiences. The theater closed in the early 1970s when a four-screen movie theater opened in the Tanforan shopping center. The El Camino Theater building was remodeled, but later demolished. The lot is now home to mixed-use apartment and retail space.  A larger, multi-screen complex was later built north of Tanforan, but it has been replaced by an even larger complex, Century at Tanforan, in the remodeled shopping center.

In 1939, the War Department created the Golden Gate National Cemetery in San Bruno as space was starting to run out for veterans to be buried at the Presidio of San Francisco. In 1942, after the start of World War II, the local racetrack became the Tanforan Assembly Center, a temporary detention site for Japanese Americans evicted from the West Coast under Executive Order 9066.

Following World War II, there was continued growth and new subdivisions were built in Mills Park, Rollingwood, and Crestmoor. In 1947, the Bayshore Freeway (U.S. Route 101) was opened from South San Francisco to Redwood City and included an interchange at San Bruno.

Prior to 1950, San Bruno's high school students attended San Mateo High School (opened in 1902) and then Burlingame High School (opened in 1923), traveling to and from school on the streetcars that ran next to the Southern Pacific railroad. Finally, on September 11, 1950, Capuchino High School opened in San Bruno. After years of using Green Hall as a multi-purpose building, the city dedicated a library and city hall in 1954. That same year saw the dedication of the current central terminal at the airport, part of a major expansion program. A central fire station was later built next to the city hall; an additional station was built in Crestmoor.

Actress and businesswoman Suzanne Somers was born in San Bruno in 1946. She attended local schools and graduated from Capuchino High School in June 1964.

In 1953, San Bruno annexed the adjoining unincorporated community of Lomita Park, bounded by San Felipe Avenue, El Camino Real, San Juan Avenue, and the railroad tracks. Until the annexation, Lomita Park had its own Southern Pacific train station and some community services.

Parkside Intermediate School was opened in 1954, followed by additional elementary schools: Rollingwood, Crestmoor, John Muir, and Carl Sandburg. A second intermediate school, Engvall, was built in Crestmoor Canyon, only to be closed, along with North Brae and Sandburg, when enrollment fell. These were all part of the San Bruno Park School District. Students in northwestern San Bruno were included in the Laguna Salada district. The private school, Highlands Christian School, is also located in San Bruno. Founded in 1966, Highlands Christian School is an interdenominational school, and offers preschool through college preparatory school instruction.

San Bruno considered new annexations in the mid-1950s that would have extended the city limits to the Pacific Ocean. The unincorporated communities west of San Bruno were against annexation, and collectively incorporated as the city of Pacifica in 1957.

On March 22, 1957, a magnitude 5.7 earthquake was centered in the area of the city. It inflicted minor damage throughout the city.

Eitel-McCullough operated a large manufacturing plant in San Bruno for many years. William Eitel and Jack McCullogh formed the company in 1934. It specialized in the manufacture of power grid tubes. Known as Eimac, the company also made vacuum tubes used in communication equipment, as well as other products for military and commercial applications. Due to its work on broadcast transmission parts, Eimac operated an FM radio station, KSBR, which transmitted on 100.5 megahertz. The station began operations in 1947 and, that same year, was one of only two in the nation to test Rangertone tape recorders. (The other station was WASH-FM in Washington, D.C.) The recorders were based on the German Magnetophon. In need of more space, the company moved to San Carlos in 1959. Eimac's San Carlos plant was dedicated on April 16, 1959. In 1965, Eimac merged with Varian Associates and became known as the Eimac Division. In 1995, Leonard Green & Partners purchased the entire Electron Devices Business from Varian and formed Communications & Power Industries.

Crestmoor High School opened in September 1962, but was closed in June 1980 due to a decline in school enrollment. The city has a two-year community college, Skyline College.

A major landmark in San Bruno for many years was Tanforan Racetrack, which opened in 1899. Such famous racehorses as Seabiscuit and Citation raced there. Famed Hollywood director Frank Capra filmed scenes for two of his films, Broadway Bill and Riding High, at the racetrack. For six months in 1942, it served as one of the main Bay Area centers for those forced into Japanese American internment, processing about 8,000 Japanese before they were sent out to larger facilities in the desert of Utah and Manzanar in Owens Valley. The track closed in 1964 and was about to be demolished when it was destroyed in a major fire on July 31, 1964. The Shops at Tanforan mall was later built on the site; surrounding city streets were named for some of the racehorses who appeared at Tanforan.

The city was the site of the crash of Flying Tiger Line Flight 282 on December 23, 1964.

During the late 1960s, the I-280 (Junipero Serra Freeway), followed by I-380, was built through San Bruno. The San Bruno Planning Commission (then chaired by Peter Weinberger, brother of Caspar Weinberger) reviewed and approved plans for two major shopping centers, Bayhill (located on the old U.S. Navy property between San Bruno Avenue and Sneath Lane) and Tanforan. With final approval from the San Bruno City Council, construction proceeded on these major retail developments. Prior to these developments, most of the city's retail businesses were located on San Mateo Avenue and El Camino Real.

San Bruno is one of two cities in the Bay Area that manages its own cable TV and internet system.

The October 17, 1989, Loma Prieta earthquake (6.9 magnitude) caused some damage in the city. The U.S. Postal Service's Western Regional headquarters, which was then the tallest building in San Bruno, had to be demolished due to severe structural damage. The site was rebuilt as part of an expansion of The Gap clothing company world headquarters campus. The building now houses the headquarters for Wal-Mart's online retail services, Walmart.com, and is now the tallest building in the city.

21st century 
The San Bruno BART station opened in 2003, when the transit system was extended to Millbrae and the San Francisco International Airport.

September 2010 explosion and fire

On September 9, 2010, at about 6:15 p.m. PDT, a gas line ruptured leading to a fire that severely damaged a residential neighborhood. Eight people were killed, nearly 60 others were injured, 38 homes were destroyed and 123 additional homes were damaged. The resulting fire "hot spots" were easily detected using meteorological satellite images.

The explosion, which took place two miles (3 km) west of San Francisco International Airport, was initially thought to have been a plane crash, but the FAA and airport officials confirmed no downed aircraft was reported.

During the days prior to the explosion, some residents reported a strong smell of natural gas in the area.

On September 10, a team from the National Transportation Safety Board began an investigation into the cause of the explosion.

On September 13, PG&E agreed to set aside a $100 million fund to the victims of the explosion. This does not preclude residents from taking any further action against PG&E. Parts of the exploded material were taken to Washington, D.C., a couple of days after the explosion for examination.

YouTube headquarters

In 2007, YouTube had moved its headquarters from San Mateo, California to San Bruno, on Cherry Avenue next to Interstate 380. The main building was initially built for Gap Inc. in 1997. It had been designed in 1994, has a green roof, and was built with energy efficient ventilation systems. Across more than six properties, YouTube has over 2,000 employees working in the city, and is San Bruno's largest employer. On April 3, 2018, a shooting took place at the headquarters complex, leaving four wounded and the female shooter dead.

Former Naval Facility San Bruno

During World War II the United States Navy established a base on what was a dairy opened by Richard Sneath. There it operated a Classification Center and a Naval Advance Base Personnel Depot. After the war it continued operation, and became host to the consolidated Western Division of Naval Facilities, supporting the multiple navy bases that were operating in the greater San Francisco Bay Area. Due to the 1993 BRAC and its closure of neighboring bases although recommended for realignment, the Navy decided to close the facility, carrying through with its decision in October 1994.

The federal government retained part of the former Naval Facility. The Pacific Region (San Francisco) facility of the National Archives and Records Administration was established. One of the buildings became a Navy and Marine Corps Reserve Center, which hosts the Headquarters Company of the 23rd Marine Regiment, amongst other units. The rest of the facility was sold to a private developer who has since built multi-story apartment buildings on the former base. The  area of the former U.S. Navy complex is bounded by San Bruno Avenue, El Camino Real, Sneath Lane, and I-280.

Economy

Top employers
According to San Bruno's 2020 Comprehensive Annual Financial Report and the San Mateo Daily Journal the top employers in the city were:

Transportation

Roads 
Interstate 280, running concurrent with California State Route 1, passes through San Bruno, and Interstate 380, which is entirely located within the city, flanks the northern part of San Bruno and connects with U.S. Route 101. The town is bisected by California State Route 82.

Public transit 
SamTrans is the dominant operator of bus public transport within San Bruno. Commuter rail to and from San Bruno is served by Caltrain, and Bay Area Rapid Transit (BART) has its red line and yellow line serve San Bruno. Both Caltrain and BART have their San Bruno stations located very close to the Shops at Tanforan, with the latter being adjacent to the mall.

Air transport 
San Bruno is adjacent to San Francisco International Airport, which can be accessed using BART or US 101. However, the other major San Francisco Bay Area airports (Oakland and San Jose) are accessible from San Bruno via BART for the former and Caltrain plus VTA services for the latter.

Notable people
 Wally Bunker, baseball player
 Emma Chamberlain, Internet personality
 Neal Dahlen, football administrator
 Luana DeVol, soprano
 Keith Hernandez, baseball player
 Ky Hollenbeck, kickboxer
 Ron "Pigpen" McKernan, musician
 Ruggiero Ricci, violinist
 Suzanne Somers, actress
 The Mummies, garage punk band
Nelson Holderman, WW1 Medal of Honor recipient

Sister cities
 Narita, Chiba Prefecture, Japan

See also 
List of cities and towns in the San Francisco Bay Area

References

External links

 

 
1849 establishments in California
1914 establishments in California
Butterfield Overland Mail in California
Cities in San Mateo County, California
Incorporated cities and towns in California
Populated places established in 1849
Populated places established in 1914